Pipers Vale is a 19.7 hectare Local Nature Reserve on the southern outskirts of Ipswich in Suffolk. It is owned and managed by Ipswich Borough Council.

This site on the bank of the River Orwell is part of Orwell Country Park. Its diverse habitats include heath, reedbeds, scrub and alder carr. Over 100 bird species have been recorded, including redwings, whimbrels and bullfinches.

There is access from Gainsborough Lane.

References

Local Nature Reserves in Suffolk